Captain Field Eugene Kindley (13 March 1896 – 2 February 1920) was an American aviator and World War I flying ace credited with twelve confirmed aerial victories.

Early life
Field Eugene Kindley was born at  Pea Ridge  in northwestern Arkansas. Kindley's mother died when he was two years old and his father took a position in the Philippines, leaving Kindley to be raised by his grandmother in Bentonville, Arkansas until the age of seven. Kindley joined his father in Manila, where he lived until 1908, when he moved to Gravette, Arkansas to live with his uncle. After completing his education he moved to Coffeyville, Kansas where he became a partner in a motion picture theater.

Military service
During his stay in Coffeyville, Kindley enlisted in the Kansas Army National Guard. Kindley volunteered for a transfer into the aviation branch of the United States Army Signal Corps. He attended the School of Military Aeronautics at the University of Illinois at Urbana-Champaign.

Kindley established himself as an unlucky and somewhat untalented flier, with a series of accidents, mechanical failures, and landing mishaps. He became part of the first group of American pilots to be transferred to England for combat training in 1917. In the spring of 1918, he completed training and commissioned as a first lieutenant in the United States Army Air Service.

On his first flight, he was assigned to ferry a Sopwith Camel from England to the western front, but crashed on the White Cliffs of Dover. Kindley was sent to hospital to recover. After his release, Kindley was assigned to the Royal Air Force's No. 65 Squadron, and scored his first aerial victory on 26 June 1918 over Albert, France shooting down the Pfalz D.III of Lt. Wilhelm Lehmann, commander of Jagdstaffel 5.

In July 1918, the United States Army formed the 148th Aero Squadron and assigned Kindley to the unit. Kindley shot down a German Albatros D.V near Ypres and earned the unit its first kill. Kindley was the appointed commanding officer of the 148th and promoted to captain. While with the 148th he scored 11 confirmed kills.

His fourth kill on 13 August 1918 was the Jasta 11 Fokker D.VII of Lothar von Richthofen, brother of "The Red Baron," Manfred von Richthofen. Lothar von Richthofen, one of Germany's finest fliers with 40 confirmed air-to-air victories, was seriously wounded and never flew in combat again.

Kindley scored four more victories in early September. Then, during missions in late September 1918, Kindley earned the Distinguished Service Cross (DSC), Distinguished Service Cross with Oak Leaf Cluster and the British Distinguished Flying Cross.

On 24 September, he led a flight of Camels in a successful attack on seven Fokkers near Bourlon Wood, France. Three days later, Kindley earned the Oak Leaf Cluster to the DSC by dropping bombs on and strafing German infantry, destroying a German observation balloon, taking out a German machine gun nest, shooting down an enemy airplane, and scaring two Fokker biplanes away from fellow fliers even after his ammunition had been exhausted.

Postwar military career and death
In 1919, Kindley was offered a contract by a New York-based motion picture company to re-enact his war service. The company offered him $60 per day for two weeks which was an extremely high wage. Kindley refused the job because he thought it might interfere with his army career.

In early 1920, Kindley was the commanding officer of the 94th Aero Squadron.

Kindley died in a crash at Kelly Field near San Antonio, Texas during a demonstration flight for General John J. Pershing. A control cable snapped on the S.E.5 Kindley was flying. Kindley is buried at Hillcrest Cemetery in Gravette, Arkansas. With his death, command of the 94th Aero Squadron was taken over by Captain J. O. Donaldson.

Honors
A city park in Gravette is named for Kindley, as is the high school in Coffeyville, Kansas. Kindley Air Force Base, also known as Kindley Field, a World War II airfield in Bermuda, was named in his honor, as was Kindley Field in the Philippines, a small auxiliary airstrip on Corregidor. The Kindley home has been acquired by the Gravette City Museum. Kindley's personal effects are on display at the Arkansas Air Museum in Fayetteville, Arkansas. A Sopwith Camel F.1 said to be Kindley's and claimed to be the only surviving Camel in the United States, was used during the filming of The Blue Max, released in 1966, and had been on loan to the Aerospace Education Center in Little Rock, Arkansas. Aerospace Education Center permanently closed 1 Jan. 2011.

Arkansas Aviation Historical Society inducted Kindley into the Arkansas Aviation Hall of Fame in 1982.

See also

List of accidents and incidents involving military aircraft (pre-1925)

References

Bibliography
 American Aces of World War I. Norman Franks, Harry Dempsey. Osprey Publishing, 2001. , .

External links

1896 births
1920 deaths
Accidental deaths in Texas
American World War I flying aces
Aviators from Arkansas
Aviators killed in aviation accidents or incidents in the United States
People from Coffeyville, Kansas
People from Gravette, Arkansas
People from Prairie Grove, Arkansas
Recipients of the Distinguished Service Cross (United States)
Recipients of the Distinguished Flying Cross (United States)
Recipients of the Distinguished Flying Cross (United Kingdom)
Royal Air Force personnel of World War I
United States Army officers
Victims of aviation accidents or incidents in 1920
Military personnel from Arkansas
Royal Air Force officers
United States Army Signal Corps personnel